Golzow is a municipality in the district Märkisch-Oderland, in Brandenburg, Germany.

Culture and sightseeing
Golzow is famous for the DEFA long-term documentary "Die Kinder von Golzow" (The children of Golzow), which accompanied the lives of people from Golzow in numerous films between 1961 and 2007.

Demography

References

External links

Localities in Märkisch-Oderland